The 2020 Poker Masters Online was the fourth season of the Poker Masters. Following the COVID-19 pandemic, the Poker Masters moved online to partypoker and took place from April 12-26, 2020. The event was sponsored by Poker Central and partypoker, and some final tables were streamed on PokerGO's Facebook page. There were 30 events on the schedule including 25 No-Limit Hold'em and five Pot-Limit Omaha tournaments. Buy-ins ranged from $10,000 to the $50,000 Main Event.

The Main Event was won by Switzerland's Linus Loeliger, and the Poker Masters Purple Jacket was awarded to Greece's Alexandros Kolonias.

Schedule 
The schedule for the 2020 Poker Masters Online included 25 No-Limit Hold'em and five Pot-Limit Omaha tournaments. All tournaments carried a prize pool guarantee of between $250,000 and $1,000,000. The $50,000 buy-in Main Event carried a $2,000,000 prize pool guarantee. Each day of play featured at least two tournaments, and would either be eight-handed or six-handed.

Purple Jacket standings 
The 2020 Poker Masters Online awarded the Purple Jacket to the player that accumulated the most points during the series. Greece's Alexandros Kolonias overtook Russia's Artur Martirosian in the final event to win the Purple Jacket. Kolonias won two events and cashed 11 times on his way to accumulating $1,266,296 in winnings. Kolonias accumulated 1,191 points and was awarded the Purple Jacket.

Results

Event #1: $25,000 No-Limit Hold'em 

 1-Day Event: April 12, 2020
 Number of Entrants: 55
 Total Prize Pool: $1,372,875
 Number of Payouts: 7

Event #2: $10,000 Pot-Limit Omaha 6-Max 

 1-Day Event: April 12, 2020
 Number of Entrants: 55
 Total Prize Pool: $551,999
 Number of Payouts: 9

Event #3: $10,000 No-Limit Hold'em 6-Max 

 1-Day Event: April 12, 2020
 Number of Entrants: 99
 Total Prize Pool: $989,999
 Number of Payouts: 12

Event #4: $10,000 No-Limit Hold'em 

 1-Day Event: April 13, 2020
 Number of Entrants: 102
 Total Prize Pool: $1,014,900
 Number of Payouts: 16

Event #5: $10,000 No-Limit Hold'em 6-Max 

 1-Day Event: April 13, 2020
 Number of Entrants: 83
 Total Prize Pool: $830,062
 Number of Payouts: 12

Event #6: $10,000 Pot-Limit Omaha 6-Max 

 1-Day Event: April 14, 2020
 Number of Entrants: 97
 Total Prize Pool: $969,999
 Number of Payouts: 12

Event #7: $10,000 No-Limit Hold'em 6-Max 

 1-Day Event: April 14, 2020
 Number of Entrants: 86
 Total Prize Pool: $859,999
 Number of Payouts: 12

Event #8: $10,000 No-Limit Hold'em 

 1-Day Event: April 15, 2020
 Number of Entrants: 104
 Total Prize Pool: $1,040,000
 Number of Payouts: 16

Event #9: $10,000 No-Limit Hold'em 6-Max 

 1-Day Event: April 15, 2020
 Number of Entrants: 78
 Total Prize Pool: $779,998
 Number of Payouts: 12

Event #10: $10,000 No-Limit Hold'em 

 1-Day Event: April 16, 2020
 Number of Entrants: 119
 Total Prize Pool: $1,190,000
 Number of Payouts: 16

Event #11: $10,000 No-Limit Hold'em 6-Max 

 1-Day Event: April 16, 2020
 Number of Entrants: 94
 Total Prize Pool: $939,999
 Number of Payouts: 12

Event #12: $10,000 Pot-Limit Omaha 6-Max 

 1-Day Event: April 17, 2020
 Number of Entrants: 87
 Total Prize Pool: $868,999
 Number of Payouts: 12

Event #13: $10,000 No-Limit Hold'em 6-Max 

 1-Day Event: April 17, 2020
 Number of Entrants: 68
 Total Prize Pool: $679,998
 Number of Payouts: 9

Event #14: $10,000 No-Limit Hold'em 

 1-Day Event: April 18, 2020
 Number of Entrants: 114
 Total Prize Pool: $1,140,000
 Number of Payouts: 16

Event #15: $10,000 Pot-Limit Omaha 6-Max 

 1-Day Event: April 18, 2020
 Number of Entrants: 78
 Total Prize Pool: $779,998
 Number of Payouts: 12

Event #16: $25,000 No-Limit Hold'em 

 1-Day Event: April 19, 2020
 Number of Entrants: 72
 Total Prize Pool: $1,800,000
 Number of Payouts: 9

Event #17: $10,000 Pot-Limit Omaha 6-Max 

 1-Day Event: April 19, 2020
 Number of Entrants: 92
 Total Prize Pool: $919,999
 Number of Payouts: 12

Event #18: $10,000 No-Limit Hold'em 6-Max 

 1-Day Event: April 19, 2020
 Number of Entrants: 104
 Total Prize Pool: $1,039,997
 Number of Payouts: 12

Event #19: $25,000 No-Limit Hold'em 

 1-Day Event: April 21, 2020
 Number of Entrants: 77
 Total Prize Pool: $1,924,999
 Number of Payouts: 10

Event #20: $10,000 No-Limit Hold'em 6-Max 

 1-Day Event: April 21, 2020
 Number of Entrants: 86
 Total Prize Pool: $859,299
 Number of Payouts: 12

Event #21: $25,000 No-Limit Hold'em 

 1-Day Event: April 22, 2020
 Number of Entrants: 77
 Total Prize Pool: $1,574,999
 Number of Payouts: 8

Event #22: $10,000 No-Limit Hold'em 6-Max 

 1-Day Event: April 22, 2020
 Number of Entrants: 86
 Total Prize Pool: $769,998
 Number of Payouts: 12

Event #23: $25,000 Pot-Limit Omaha 6-Max 

 1-Day Event: April 23, 2020
 Number of Entrants: 64
 Total Prize Pool: $1,524,999
 Number of Payouts: 9

Event #24: $10,000 No-Limit Hold'em 6-Max 

 1-Day Event: April 23, 2020
 Number of Entrants: 110
 Total Prize Pool: $1,099,999
 Number of Payouts: 18

Event #25: $25,000 No-Limit Hold'em 

 1-Day Event: April 24, 2020
 Number of Entrants: 64
 Total Prize Pool: $1,600,000
 Number of Payouts: 8

Event #26: $10,000 No-Limit Hold'em 6-Max 

 1-Day Event: April 24, 2020
 Number of Entrants: 110
 Total Prize Pool: $909,999
 Number of Payouts: 12

Event #27: $25,000 No-Limit Hold'em 

 1-Day Event: April 25, 2020
 Number of Entrants: 51
 Total Prize Pool: $1,372,875
 Number of Payouts: 7

Event #28: $10,000 No-Limit Hold'em 6-Max 

 1-Day Event: April 25, 2020
 Number of Entrants: 56
 Total Prize Pool: $760,000
 Number of Payouts: 12

Event #29: $50,000 No-Limit Hold'em Main Event 

 1-Day Event: April 25, 2020
 Number of Entrants: 77
 Total Prize Pool: $3,850,000
 Number of Payouts: 10

Event #30: $10,000 No-Limit Hold'em 6-Max 

 1-Day Event: April 25, 2020
 Number of Entrants: 77
 Total Prize Pool: $1,459,996
 Number of Payouts: 18

References

External links 

 Results

2020 in poker
Television shows about poker
Poker tournaments